Mengbei station, is a station of Line 4 of the Nanjing Metro. It started operations on 18 January 2017.

References

Railway stations in Jiangsu
Railway stations in China opened in 2017
Nanjing Metro stations